Integrated SOFT Audit is an integrated audit approach that focuses on the key and material components of four differing audit approaches relevant to an auditee, based on a detailed risk assessment performed annually. This approach integrates the key aspects of:
 S – Sarbanes–Oxley Act of 2002 Compliance Audit
 O – Operational audit/Best Industry Practices
 F – Financial Substantive Audit Procedures
 T – Transactional Auditing

External links
 http://www.thesoftaudit.com/uploads/Internal_Auditor_August_2007.pdf

Auditing in the United States